Joaquín 'Ximo' Navarro Jiménez (born 23 January 1990) is a Spanish professional footballer who plays for Dutch club Fortuna Sittard as a right-back.

Club career
Born in Guadahortuna, Province of Granada, Andalusia, Navarro graduated from local RCD Mallorca's youth system in 2009. He made his senior debut with the reserve team in the Segunda División B, starting in all games but one over the course of two seasons and being relegated in his second.

In summer 2011, Navarro was loaned to Recreativo de Huelva of Segunda División. He made his official debut on 27 August, in a 1–0 away loss against Deportivo de La Coruña. In January 2012, he signed with second-tier club Córdoba CF also on loan.

Navarro returned to the Balearic Islands for 2012–13. He made his La Liga debut on 18 August 2012, starting the 2–1 home win over RCD Espanyol, and contributed 16 league appearances as the campaign ended in relegation.

Navarro was an undisputed starter the following season with Mallorca, who narrowly avoided another drop. He returned to the top flight on 12 June 2014, joining UD Almería on a three-year contract.

On 17 June 2017, Navarro agreed to a three-year deal with top-flight side UD Las Palmas on a free transfer. On 6 July of the following year, he joined Deportivo Alavés of the same league on a three-year contract.

Club statistics

References

External links

1990 births
Living people
Sportspeople from the Province of Granada
Spanish footballers
Footballers from Andalusia
Association football defenders
La Liga players
Segunda División players
Segunda División B players
RCD Mallorca B players
RCD Mallorca players
Recreativo de Huelva players
Córdoba CF players
UD Almería players
UD Las Palmas players
Deportivo Alavés players
Eredivisie players
Fortuna Sittard players
Spanish expatriate footballers
Expatriate footballers in the Netherlands
Spanish expatriate sportspeople in the Netherlands